Mariginiup is an outer northern suburb of Perth, Western Australia, located within the City of Wanneroo.

References

Suburbs of Perth, Western Australia
Suburbs of the City of Wanneroo